Dato Paduka Janin Erih was a Bruneian diplomat and holding the post of Permanent Representative of Brunei Darussalam to the United Nations at Geneva and the former Ambassador Extraordinary and Plenipotentiary of Brunei to the Russian Federation.

See also 
 Ambassador of Brunei to Russia
 Ambassador of Brunei to Lao PDR

References 

Bruneian diplomats
Year of birth missing (living people)
Living people
Ambassadors of Brunei to Russia
Permanent Representatives of Brunei to the United Nations